Patrick Joseph McFlynn (9 May 1918 – 24 September 2013) was an Irish sports administrator who served as the 26th president of the Gaelic Athletic Association.

Born in Magherafelt, McFlynn was a founder member of the O'Donovan Rossa club in Magherafelt and went on to become Derry county secretary in 1940 at the age of 23. He won a Senior County Championship medal with his club in 1942.

When he moved to Down because of his teaching job, his club was Tullylish.

He died in September 2013 at the age of 95.

References

 

1918 births
2013 deaths
Derry County Board administrators
Gaelic games players from County Londonderry
Presidents of the Gaelic Athletic Association
Secretaries of county boards of the Gaelic Athletic Association